Hibbertia cuneiformis, commonly known as cut-leaf hibbertia, is species of erect or sprawling shrub that is endemic to the south-west of Western Australia.

The species was first formally described in 1806 by French naturalist Jacques Labillardière who gave it the name Candollea cuneiformis in his Novae Hollandiae Plantarum Specimen. In 1811, English botanist James Edward Smith changed the name to Hibbertia cuneiformis in Abraham Rees's Cyclopædia. The specific epithet (cuneiformis) means "wedge-shaped".

Hibbertia cuneiformis grows on sand dunes and in swampy places in near coastal-areas of the Esperance Plains, Jarrah Forest, Swan Coastal Plain and Warren biogeographic regions of south-western Western Australia. It is classified as "not threatened" by the Western Australian Government Department of Parks and Wildlife.

References

cuneiformis
Eudicots of Western Australia